Things of Stone and Wood or ToSaW are an Australian folk rock band which formed in 1989. The original line-up was Michael Bruce Allen on bass guitar and backing vocals; Greg Arnold on lead vocals and acoustic guitar; Justin Brady on violin, mandolin and harmonica; and Tony Floyd on drums and percussion. Two of their albums, The Yearning (February 1993) and Junk Theatre (March 1995) peaked at No. 8 on the ARIA Albums Chart. Their 1992 single, "Happy Birthday Helen" reached No. 9 on the ARIA Singles Chart, which was written by Arnold for his then-girlfriend, whom he later married. At the ARIA Music Awards of 1993 the group won ARIA Award for Best New Talent for "Share This Wine". Arnold won 'Songwriter of the Year' at the 1993 APRA Awards.

"Happy Birthday Helen" was listed at No. 91 on the Triple J Hottest 100 in 1993. The group disbanded in 1998, reformed in 2001 and broke up again in 2006. In 2013 the original lineup reunited and in 2014 they embarked on a 25th Anniversary tour.

History

1989–1994: Formation and The Yearning

Things of Stone and Wood formed in Melbourne in 1989 with Michael Allen on bass guitar and backing vocals; Greg Arnold on lead vocals and acoustic guitar; Justin Brady on violin, mandolin and harmonica; and Tony Floyd on drums and percussion. Both Allen and Arnold were former members of Thirteen at Midnight, an indie rock group. That band had formed in 1986 and included Russell Hall on bass guitar and Byron Smith on guitar, they had issued a single, "She Sells Sanctuary" (1986), and an album, Warring Tribes (1988) on Cleopatra Records.

One of Things of Stone and Wood's earliest gigs was at the 21st birthday party for Helen Durham – Arnold's then-girlfriend. The group took up long term residencies in Melbourne and followed with interstate touring on the pub and club circuit. In September 1991 they issued their debut single, "The Hopeful", on Things Records, which was produced by James Black (Greg Champion). Black was also their manager and had been a guitarist or keyboardist in Russell Morris Band, Mondo Rock and The Revelators. In 1992 the band had signed with Sony and recorded their debut album, The Yearning. In September 1992, the album's lead single "Share this Wine" was released which reached the ARIA Singles Chart top 50. The album's second single, "Happy Birthday Helen", was released in November and reached No. 9. Arnold, who later married Durham, had written the track for her 22nd birthday:
 "Happy Birthday Helen" was parodied on Australian Broadcasting Corporation's TV series, The Late Show, in 1992 as "We've Just Run Out of Melbourne Cliches". Arnold heard in advance that it was due to appear, "I got worried, but it was all quite flattering. Their video is hilarious". "Happy Birthday Helen" was listed at No. 91 on the Triple J Hottest 100 in 1993. The Yearning was released in February 1993 and peaked at No. 8 on the ARIA Albums Chart.

At the ARIA Music Awards of 1993 Things of Stone and Wood won 'Best New Talent' for "Share this Wine". During 1993 they supported national tours by Australian artists Midnight Oil, Paul Kelly, and by Irish folk-rocker, Luka Bloom. Late that year they toured Europe. Arnold won 'Songwriter of the Year' at the 1993 APRA Awards.

At the ARIA Music Awards of 1994 The Yearning was nominated for 'Breakthrough Artist – Album' and 'Best Cover Art' (for Marcelle Lunam's artwork). The Yearning received critical acclaim from AllMusic's Jonathan Lewis, "shown a strong social conscience in their lyrics; in particular, they condemned the apparent rise of racism in Australia". It was accredited with a gold certificate.

1995–2000: Junk Theatre and break-up

Their follow-up album, Junk Theatre, released in March 1995 was also produced by Black. It peaked at No. 8 but dropped out of the top 50 after four weeks. Australian rock music historian, Ian McFarlane felt it "highlighted the band's eternal capacity for adventurous folk-pop arrangements, mellifluous melodies and Arnold's astute and sometimes acrid lyrical observations". Its lead single, "Wildflowers" was released in August 1994, which reached the top 50, and was the most played Australian single on radio during October. The next single, "Churchill's Black Dog", was released in February 1995 and reached the top 40. At the end of that year the band left Sony.

Their third album, The Man with the Perfect Hair, appeared in November 1995 on their own independent label, Things Records and was co-produced by Black and the group. The title is a reference to The 7.30 Reports host, Kerry O'Brien. McFarlane noted it was "[a]imed at the dedicated ToSaW fan, [which] comprised a pleasantly relaxed, single-take, 'unplugged' session that featured new songs, reworked B-sides and a dodgy Beatles cover, 'I've Just Seen a Face'". Their musical style followed a Beatle-esque path, Brady left and the group became a three-piece. In October 1996 the group's fourth album, Whirligig, was released, which was co-produced by Things of Stone and Wood, Black and Simon Holmes (The Fauves). McFarlane described it as "another batch of joyful folk-pop such as the Beatlesque 'Blink'". After a tour in late 1998 the band went on a hiatus as individual members pursued other projects. Allen had already issued his debut solo album, Aeroplane (June), and followed with his second, Softness Isn’t Admired Enough (August 1999). In 1999 Arnold formed a new band, Tricycle, with Anita Hustas on double bass and Ian Kitney on drums, which issued their debut album, Super (September).

2001–present: Reformation and compilations
Things of Stone & Wood reformed in 2001 and released a compilation album So Far: Best of Things of Stone & Wood 1992-2002 in 2002, which featured a new single "Ship of the Damned". The lineup of Allen, Arnold and Floyd were joined by Richard Tankard on keyboard. A new studio album, Rollercoaster, was released in 2003. Arnold wrote most of the songs for the group. By 2006 the group had disbanded again – except irregular 'one-off' performance reunions.

Arnold released his solo album Lost Marie in 2007. He is a music lecturer at Northern Melbourne Institute of TAFE, and worked as a producer recording work by Junior, Chloe Hall, Carus & the True Believers, Georgia Fields, Stonefield and Skipping Girl Vinegar.

In May 2014 they toured Australia playing dates in Brisbane, Adelaide, Sydney, Melbourne and Hobart. In June, Arnold and his wife Helen relocated to Europe. ToSaW continue as a side project when Greg is in Australia.

Members
 Michael Bruce Allen – bass guitar, keyboards, guitar, vocals (1989–1998, 2001–2006, 2013–present)
 Greg Arnold – vocals, guitar, keyboards (1989–1998, 2001–2006, 2013–present)
 Tony Floyd – drums, percussion, recorder, vocals (1989–1998, 2001–2006, 2013–present)
 Justin Brady – harmonica, violin, mandolin, guitar (1989–1995, 1997–1998, 2013–2015)
 John Bedggood –violin, mandolin (2001–2002)
 Richard Tankard – Hammond organ (2001–2006)

Discography

Studio albums

Live albums

Compilation albums

Singles

Awards and nominations

ARIA Music Awards
The ARIA Music Awards is an annual awards ceremony that recognises excellence, innovation, and achievement across all genres of Australian music. They commenced in 1987.

|
|-
|rowspan="2"| 1993
|rowspan="2"| "Share This Wine"
| ARIA Award for Best New Talent
| 
|rowspan="2"|
|-
| ARIA Award for Breakthrough Artist – Single
| 
|-
|rowspan="4"| 1994
| The Yearning
| ARIA Award for Breakthrough Artist – Album
| 
|rowspan="4"|
|-
| Marcelle Lunam for Things of Stone and Wood The Yearning
| ARIA Award for Best Cover Art
| 
|-
| James Black for Things of Stone and Wood "Rock This Boat", "Single Perfect Raindrop", "Heidelberg" and "Barkley Street"
| ARIA Award for Producer of the Year
| 
|-
| "Happy Birthday Helen"
| ARIA Award for Highest Selling Single
| 
|-

References

General
  Note: Archived [on-line] copy has limited functionality.
Specific

ARIA Award winners
Australian folk music groups
Australian indie rock groups
Musical groups established in 1989
Musical groups disestablished in 1998
Musical groups reestablished in 2001
Musical groups disestablished in 2006
Victoria (Australia) musical groups